Vashutino is a rural locality (a village) in Posyolok Anopino, Gus-Khrustalny District, Vladimir Oblast, Russia. The population was 898 as of 2010. There are 17 streets.

Geography 
Vashutino is located 13 km northeast of Gus-Khrustalny (the district's administrative centre) by road. Babino is the nearest rural locality.

References 

Rural localities in Gus-Khrustalny District